Asagas is a settlement in the south of Guam. It is located in the village of Inarajan at the southern end of the east coast.

References 

Populated places in Guam